Oskar Drobne (born 6 February 1975) is a Slovenian football manager and former player.

Club career
Drobne played for Varteks in the Croatian Prva HNL during the 2000–01 and 2001–02 seasons. He had a brief spell with FC St. Pauli in the German 2. Bundesliga during the 1998–99 season.

References

External links
NZS profile 

1975 births
Living people
Sportspeople from Celje
Slovenian footballers
Association football forwards
Slovenian expatriate footballers
NK Maribor players
FC St. Pauli players
ND Gorica players
NK Domžale players
NK Varaždin players
NK Dravograd players
Doxa Katokopias FC players
NK Celje players
FC Koper players
Expatriate footballers in Germany
Slovenian expatriate sportspeople in Germany
Expatriate footballers in Croatia
Slovenian expatriate sportspeople in Croatia
Expatriate footballers in Cyprus
Slovenian expatriate sportspeople in Cyprus
Slovenian Second League players
Slovenian PrvaLiga players
2. Bundesliga players
Croatian Football League players
Slovenia under-21 international footballers
Slovenian football managers